The Samsung Q1 was a family of ultra-mobile PCs produced by Samsung with a 7" (18 cm) LCD and exists in several different versions with either Windows XP Tablet PC Edition or Windows Vista Home Premium.

Variations

Q1 series

Samsung Q1 

Intel Celeron M ULV (Ultra Low Voltage) 353 running at 900 MHz
40 GB 1.8" Hard Drive (ZIF interface)
512MB DDR2 533
Max memory 2GB DDR2 533
Mobile Intel 915GMS Express Chipset
7 inch WVGA (800×480) resistive (single-touch) touch screen (using finger or stylus) with the included "Easy Display Manager" software allowing the user to downscale from 1024×600 and 1024×768 with a few button presses.
VGA port
Weighs 0.78 kg
3-cell battery (up to 3 hours) or 6-cell battery (up to 6 hours)
WLAN 802.11b/g
LAN port 100 mbit
CompactFlash port Type II
Stereo speakers
Array mics
AVS mode using Windows XP embedded
Bluetooth enabled
Digital Multimedia Broadcasting
2 USB ports

The Q1 is one of the first ultra-mobile computers (UMPC) produced under Microsoft's "Origami" project. The Q1 can boot into two different modes: typical Windows XP (OS can be replaced), and AVS mode running Windows XP Embedded. AVS mode runs in a separate partition and boots directly to a music, photo, and video player with no Windows Explorer interface. The AVS feature is unique to the Q1.

Samsung Q1 SSD 
The SSD version is identical to the Q1 except that the 40 GB hard disk drive has been replaced by Samsung's 32 GB solid-state drive. At release, the SSD version was about twice as expensive as the normal Q1.

Samsung Q1b 
The Q1b was Samsung's second UMPC device, with a much improved battery life and 30% brighter screen compared to the Q1. The CF card slot and the Ethernet port were removed on this version. It also had a mono speaker and a single microphone.

VIA C7-M ULV @ 1 GHz
5 Hour Battery Life (using standard 3-cell battery)
30% Brighter Screen (LED backlight)
Wi-Fi (802.11 b/g support)
Bluetooth v2.0
512 MB DDR RAM
40 GB Hard Drive
Optional WiBro Module
Optional HSDPA cellular Module

Samsung Q1F (Pentium M) 
Manufacturer Part #: NP-Q1-F000

This is almost identical to the original Q1 but with a faster 1 GHz Intel Pentium M processor (723) which enables SpeedStep technology for better battery usage. It is possible to buy a 6-cell battery instead of the default 3-cell to double the time on all these devices. The Pentium edition also has:

1 GB DDR2 RAM
40 or 60 GB Hard Drive
Microsoft Windows Vista

Q1 Ultra series
The Q1 Ultra series differed greatly from the original Q1 series with more features, including:

 Split keyboard
 SD card slot (replacing the CF card slot on its predecessor)
 Higher-resolution screen(1024×600 compared to 800×480)
 Front-facing camera
 The ability to use the joystick as a mouse.

Samsung Q1 Ultra 

The Ultra model runs on a 600/800 MHz Intel A100/A110 (Stealey) processor and includes dual cameras, a 40GB/60GB hard disk, HSDPA and just like its predecessor, it comes installed with either Windows XP or Vista.

All Q1U models offer a new split keyboard, 1GB of RAM (user upgradeable to 2GB), a SD card slot (excluding the base model), and a 1024×600 screen.  A GPS accessory is also offered, which may be used with the included mapping software.

Samsung Q1 Ultra Premium 

Uses an Intel Core Solo U1500 processor at 1330 MHz. 1GB of RAM upgradeable to 2GB.

This was the last and highest performance machine in the Q1 and Q1 Ultra series.

See also
 OQO
 Tablet PC
 Sony Vaio UX Micro PC
 Fujitsu Lifebook U Series
 VIA NanoBook
 Nokia 770 Internet Tablet
 Nokia N800
 Pepper Pad
 Raon Digital Everun

References

External links 
 Official Samsung Q1 Specifications (archived)
 Official Samsung Q1b Specifications
 Official Samsung Q1P Specifications (archived)

Mobile computers
Q1